The General Tadeusz Kościuszko Military University of Land Forces (Akademia Wojsk Lądowych imienia generała Tadeusza Kościuszki)  is a Polish Land Forces military university in Wrocław, Poland. It trains officers with experience and values to serve in units under the Land Forces. Established in 2002, its origins date back to the Polish-Lithuanian Commonwealth.

Alumni
 Włodzimierz Potasiński
 Piotr Patalong
 Roman Polko
 Tadeusz Sapierzyński
 Zdzisław Żurawski
 Kazimierz Gilarski

References

External links
 http://www.awl.edu.pl/

Universities and colleges in Wrocław
Military academies of Poland
Military installations of Poland
Buildings and structures in Wrocław